Catawissa was a historic tugboat located at Waterford in Saratoga County, New York.  She was built in 1896-1897 by Harlan and Hollingsworth of Wilmington, Delaware for the Philadelphia and Reading Railroad to tow coal barges between ports on the Eastern Seaboard.  She was 158 feet in length, 19 feet in beam and 18 feet in depth.  She was registered at 558 gross tons.  She had a riveted steel framed and plated hull. She was renamed New York in 1941.

Listed on the National Register of Historic Places in 1996, Catawissa was scrapped in 2008.

References

External links

Tugboats of the United States
Ships on the National Register of Historic Places in New York (state)
1896 ships
Saratoga County, New York
National Register of Historic Places in Saratoga County, New York
Ships built by Harlan and Hollingsworth